The 2020 A-League Grand Final was the fifteenth A-League Grand Final, the championship-deciding match of the Australian A-League and the culmination of the 2019–20 season. The match was originally scheduled to be played in May 2020 but was postponed due to the COVID-19 pandemic, and was played on 30 August 2020 between Sydney FC and Melbourne City at Bankwest Stadium in the western Sydney suburb of Parramatta, New South Wales.

Sydney FC defeated Melbourne City, who were appearing in their first Grand Final, by 1 goal to nil. The win meant Sydney claimed their fifth A-League championship, a record amount for any club in Australian domestic league football.

Teams
In the following table, finals until 2004 were in the National Soccer League era, since 2006 were in the A-League era.

Route to the final

The 2019–20 season was the league's fifteenth since its inception in 2005, and the 43rd season of top-flight association football in Australia. Eleven teams competed in the regular season, with each team playing a total of 26 matches, resulting in an uneven fixture that involved some clubs meeting three times and others meeting only twice. The top six teams qualified for the finals series, which were played in a straight-knockout format, with the top two teams earning an automatic place in the semi-finals and the bottom four teams playing off in elimination finals. The two winners of the semi-finals met in the grand final. Sydney FC and Melbourne City qualified for the semi-finals by virtue of finishing first and second respectively, whilst Wellington Phoenix (third) met Perth Glory (sixth) in the first elimination final and Brisbane Roar (fourth) took on Western United (fifth) in the second elimination final. Perth and Western United won their respective matches by one goal to nil. As the top-ranked team Sydney FC were paired with and defeated Perth, the lowest-ranked winning team, for their semi-final, whilst Melbourne City were victorious against Western United in the other semi-final. 

Due to travel restrictions imposed as a result of the COVID-19 pandemic, all finals matches and the grand final were played at Bankwest Stadium in New South Wales.

Pre-match

Venue
The Grand Final was held at Bankwest Stadium, Sydney, New South Wales. It was the first Grand Final held at the venue.

Attendance
Most A-League matches played after the season's resumption in mid-July were played behind closed doors, with others played before limited crowds in size due to COVID-19 restrictions imposed on sporting events by the New South Wales Government. A limited number of people were permitted into Bankwest Stadium for the Grand Final.

Match

Summary
The match started with Melbourne City attacking repeatedly, with five shots in the first ten minutes, including many close chances. They nearly scored the first goal in the eighteenth minute with a Harrison Delbridge strike, however the video assistant referee (VAR) ruled that Lachlan Wales, who was in an offside position, obstructed the sight of Sydney FC's goalkeeper Andrew Redmayne, meaning that the goal would not stand. Soon after, Sydney FC's Adam Le Fondre was seen to have been pulled down in the box by City's Curtis Good, however penalty shouts were ignored by referee Chris Beath and the VAR asserted this assessment. As the game progressed, Sydney eased into it however both teams still had a plethora of attacking opportunities, none of which were able to settle the result inside regular time due to exemplary showings from both Redmayne and City goalkeeper Tom Glover. The deadlock was eventually broken when Rhyan Grant of Sydney FC managed to rebound the ball of his chest and into the goal off a pass from Luke Brattan in the 100th minute. Controversially, Grant then covered his face with his shirt, an offence that the laws of the game require to be punished with a yellow card, one that would have seen him sent off for a second bookable offence. After the game the referees boss Strebre Delovski stated that doing so would have been "very harsh" as the reason for not doing so. More chances came and went however the match ended 1–0, with the regular season premiers prevailing for the fifth time, the most championships of any side in the history of Australia's top flight. Meanwhile, the Joe Marston Medal was awarded to the only goalscorer on the night, Rhyan Grant.

Details

Statistics

Broadcasting
The Grand Final was broadcast throughout Australia live on Fox Sports and delayed on ABC Me. The radio rights for the match were held by ABC Radio Grandstand as well as SEN & SWR Triple 9 FM.

It was also shown on ESPN+ in the United States, as a simulcast of the Fox Sports broadcast.

See also
 2019–20 A-League
 List of A-League honours

External links
 Official A-League website\

References

2019–20 A-League season
A-League Men Grand Finals
A-League Grand Finals
Soccer in Sydney
A-League, 2020
Sydney FC matches
Melbourne City FC matches